"You Believed" is a song by Swedish singer Pandora featuring Matt Hewie. The song was released in April 2010 as the second single from Pandora's tenth studio album Head Up High (2011). The song peaked at number 3 on the Swedish charts, becoming Pandora's twelfth top ten single in Sweden.

Scandipop said "You Believed" is a club pop orientated mixture of euro house and electro house and that it was "really quite underwhelming".

Track listing
CD single / Digital download
 "You Believed" (Radio Edit) - 3:31
 "You Believed" (Extended)	- 6:11
 "You Believed" (Euroversion Mix) - 2:57

 Remixes
 "You Believed" (Radio Edit) - 3:32
 "You Believed" (Slow Piano String Version) - 3:29
 "You Believed" (Mediterranean Sunset Swing Radio Edit) - 3:37
 "You Believed" (Eurovision Mix)	- 2:56
 "You Believed" (BEEZED Radio)	- 3:33
 "You Believed" (Patric Remann & Amir Hakim Radio) - 4:08
 "You Believed" (Mitch Remix) - 7:06
 "You Believed" (Aurelle & Jacquet's Belgrade Splav Remix) - 6:11
 "You Believed" (Extended Version) - 6:11
 "You Believed" (Mediterranean Sunset Swing Extended)	- 7:04
 "You Believed" (BEEZED Remix) - 5:42
 "You Believed" (Patric Remann & Amir Hakim Extended)	- 5:07

Chart performance

References

2010 singles
2010 songs
English-language Swedish songs
Pandora (singer) songs